Veerabayangaram is a village near Koogaiyur town in Chinnasalem block of Kallakurichi district, Tamil Nadu.

Location
It is located at a distance of 80 km from Salem, Tamil Nadu.

Demographics

Education
Primary school (Veerabayangaram)
Government higher secondary school (Koogaiyur)

References

 Police Policy Note
 Sacred Groves in Tamil Nadu

Villages in Kallakurichi district
Tourism in Tamil Nadu